Harry Parry (possibly from the Darlington, South Carolina area) was a NASCAR Grand National race car owner who employed Ray Platte for the 1955 Southern 500 only. Parry never bothered to employ race car drivers for another race because he only won $100 ($ when adjusted for inflation) for his attempt as a NASCAR owner.

References

NASCAR team owners
People from Darlington, South Carolina
Year of birth unknown
Year of death unknown